The 2015 VMI Keydets baseball team represented the Virginia Military Institute during the 2015 NCAA Division I baseball season. The Keydets returned to the Southern Conference after an eleven-year hiatus in the Big South from 2003 to 2014. VMI was led by first-year head coach Jonathan Hadra, who replaced longtime Keydet skipper Marlin Ikenberry. Ikenberry resigned following the 2014 season for a career in private business, and was the Keydets' all-time winningest baseball coach.

Personnel
VMI lost two of its starting pitchers following the 2014 season. Senior left-hander Connor Bach graduated, and was drafted by the Washington Nationals in the 21st round of the 2014 MLB Draft. Additionally, junior pitcher Reed Garrett was drafted by the Texas Rangers in the 16th round, and chose to leave school early to pursue a career in baseball. Garrett played with the Spokane Indians, the Class A-Short season affiliate of the Rangers. The Keydets also graduated left fielder and backup catcher Eric Mayers, as well as relievers Berkley Hawkins, Campbell Henkel, and Travis Thomas.

Returning starters

Roster

Schedule

|-
! style="background:#FFF;color:#000000;" | Regular Season
|-

|- align="center" bgcolor="bbffbb"
| February 13 || at  || Harmon Stadium || 3–1 || A. Woods (1–0) || T. Moore (0–1)  || T. Edens (1) || 402 || 1–0 || –
|- align="center" bgcolor="ffbbbb"
| February 14 || at North Florida || Harmon Stadium || 11–16 || A. Smith (1–0) || T. Edens (0–1) ||  || 416 || 1–1 || –
|- align="center" bgcolor="bbffbb"
| February 15 || at North Florida || Harmon Stadium || 2–1 || B. Barbery (1–0) || E. Incinelli (0–1) || M. Gorman (1) || 343 || 2–1 || –
|- align="center" bgcolor="ffffff"
| February 17 || at  || Plumeri Park || colspan=7| Cancelled
|- align="center" bgcolor="ffffff"
| February 20 || Buffalo || Gray–Minor Stadium || colspan=7| Cancelled
|- align="center" bgcolor="ffffff"
| February 21 ||  || Gray–Minor Stadium || colspan=7| Cancelled
|- align="center" bgcolor="ffffff"
| February 21 || Buffalo || Gray–Minor Stadium || colspan=7| Cancelled
|- align="center" bgcolor="ffffff"
| February 22 || UMES || Gray–Minor Stadium || colspan=7| Cancelled
|- align="center" bgcolor="ffffff"
| February 27 ||  || Gray–Minor Stadium || colspan=7| Cancelled
|- align="center" bgcolor="ffffff"
| February 28 || Marist || Gray–Minor Stadium || colspan=7| Cancelled

|- align="center" bgcolor="ffffff"
| March 1 || Marist || Gray–Minor Stadium || colspan=7| Cancelled
|- align="center" bgcolor="ffffff"
| March 3 || at Virginia || Davenport Field || colspan=7| Postponed to Apr. 1
|- align="center" bgcolor="bbffbb"
| March 6 ||  || Gray–Minor Stadium || 15–4 || A. Woods (2–0) || Ostner (0–3) ||  || 339 || 3–1 || –
|- align="center" bgcolor="ffbbbb"
| March 7 || Binghamton || Gray–Minor Stadium || 3–7 || Hardy (1–1) || B. Lafin (0–1) ||  || 155 || 3–2 || –
|- align="center" bgcolor="ffbbbb"
| March 8 || Binghamton || Gray–Minor Stadium || 6–13 || Grillini (1–0) || B. Barbery (1–1) ||  || 104 || 3–3 || –
|- align="center" bgcolor="bbffbb"
| March 11 || at  || Eagle Field || 7–3 || J. Silva (1–0) || T. Jones (0–1) ||  || 234 || 4–3 || –
|- align="center" bgcolor="ffbbbb"
| March 13 ||  || Gray–Minor Stadium || 1–3 || M. Blandino (1–0) || A. Woods (2–1) ||  || 103 || 4–4 || –
|- align="center" bgcolor="ffbbbb"
| March 15 || Central Connecticut State || Gray–Minor Stadium || 5–6 || A. Salnitis (1–0) || T. Edens (0–2) || K. Connolly (1) || 203 || 4–5 || –
|- align="center" bgcolor="ffbbbb"
| March 15 || Central Connecticut State || Gray–Minor Stadium || 2–4 (7) || C. Brown (1–0) || A. Heenan (0–1) ||  || 221 || 4–6 || –
|- align="center" bgcolor="ffbbbb"
| March 17 || at Old Dominion || Bud Metheny Baseball Complex || 5–8 || M. Reinerth (1–0) || R. Bennett (0–1) || S. Sinnen (3) || 922 || 4–7 || –
|- align="center" bgcolor="ffbbbb"
| March 18 || at Old Dominion || Bud Metheny Baseball Complex || 6–7 || Z. Rutherford (1–0) || M. Gorman (0–1) ||  || 505 || 4–8 || –
|- align="center" bgcolor="ffbbbb"
| March 20 || at  || Russell C. King Field || 2–5 || M. Milburn (5–0) || J. Silva (1–1) || W. Stillman (7) || 182 || 4–9 || 0–1
|- align="center" bgcolor="ffbbbb"
| March 21 || at Wofford || Russell C. King Field || 7–8 || J. Condra-Bogan (1–1) || M. Eagle (0–1) || W. Stillman (8) || 267 || 4–10 || 0–2
|- align="center" bgcolor="bbffbb"
| March 22 || at Wofford || Russell C. King Field || 2–1 || B. Barbery (2–1) || Scott (3–1) || T. Edens (2) || 226 || 5–10 || 1–2
|- align="center" bgcolor="ffbbbb"
| March 24 || at VCU || The Diamond || 0–18 || Thompson (2–2) || M. Eagle (0–2) ||  || 606 || 5–11 || –
|- align="center" bgcolor="ffbbbb"
| March 25 || Old Dominion || Gray–Minor Stadium || 3–11 || N. Matheson (1–0) || J. Kelley (0–1) ||  || 95 || 5–12 || –
|- align="center" bgcolor="ffbbbb"
| March 27 ||  || Gray–Minor Stadium || 2–15 || A. Ledford (3–2) || A. Heenan (0–2) ||  || 103 || 5–13 || 1–3
|- align="center" bgcolor="bbffbb"
| March 28 || Samford || Gray–Minor Stadium || 6–2 || B. Barbery (3–1) || J. Brasher (0–2) || T. Edens (3) || 137 || 6–13 || 2–3
|- align="center" bgcolor="ffbbbb"
| March 29 || Samford || Gray–Minor Stadium || 5–10 || P. Curry (3–3) || M. Eagle (0–3) || A. Gracia (5) || 207 || 6–14 || 2–4
|- align="center" bgcolor="ffbbbb"
| March 31 || at Virginia Tech || English Field || 5–6 || C. Monaco (2–0) || K. Staats (0–1) || S. Kennedy (2) || 844 || 6–15 || –

|- align="center" bgcolor="bbffbb"
| April 1 || at Virginia || Davenport Field || 7–6 || K. Staats (1–1) || R. Cummins (0–1) || T. Edens (4) || 3,014 || 7–15 || –
|- align="center" bgcolor="ffbbbb"
| April 3 || at  || Latham Baseball Stadium || 2–7 || M. Solter (1–2) || A. Heenan (1–3) ||  || 314 || 7–16 || 2–5
|- align="center" bgcolor="bbffbb"
| April 4 || at Furman || Latham Baseball Stadium || 13–10 || A. Woods (3–1) || G. Schuermann (2–1) || T. Edens (5) || N/A || 8–16 || 3–5
|- align="center" bgcolor="bbffbb"
| April 4 || at Furman || Latham Baseball Stadium || 12–11 || J. Silva (2–1) || W. Gaddis (2–3) || T. Edens (6) || 376 || 9–16 || 4–5
|- align="center" bgcolor="ffbbbb"
| April 7 ||  || Gray–Minor Stadium || 2–6 || A. Ross (2–0) || M. Eagle (0–4) ||  || 201 || 9–17 || –
|- align="center" bgcolor="ffbbbb"
| April 10 ||  || Gray–Minor Stadium || 4–8 || L. Haeberle (3–5) || A. Heenan (0–4) ||  || 201 || 9–18 || 4–6
|- align="center" bgcolor="ffbbbb"
| April 11 || East Tennessee State || Gray–Minor Stadium || 6–9 || J. Nesselt (4–3) || B. Barbery (3–2) || D. Cate (4) || 245 || 9–19 || 4–7
|- align="center" bgcolor="bbffbb"
| April 12 || East Tennessee State || Gray–Minor Stadium || 5–4 || J. Gomersall (1–0) || G. Krieg (1–4) || T. Edens (7) || 167 || 10–19 || 5–7
|- align="center" bgcolor="ffffff"
| April 14 || VCU || Gray–Minor Stadium || colspan=7| Cancelled
|- align="center" bgcolor="ffbbbb"
| April 15 ||  || Gray–Minor Stadium || 5–10 || P. Bayer (1–3) || J. Gomersall (1–1) ||  || 79 || 10–20 || –
|- align="center" bgcolor="ffbbbb"
| April 17 || at  || John Henry Moss Stadium || 1–3 || Heiligenstad (4–3) || A. Heenan (0–5) || Haymes (3) || 150 || 10–21 || –
|- align="center" bgcolor="bbffbb"
| April 18 || at Gardner–Webb || John Henry Moss Stadium || 4–3 || A. Woods (4–1) || Hallman (4–2) || T. Edens (8) || 250 || 11–21 || –
|- align="center" bgcolor="bbffbb"
| April 18 || at Gardner–Webb || John Henry Moss Stadium || 7–3 || B. Barbery (4–2) || Warner (2–4) || T. Edens (9) || 155 || 12–21 || –
|- align="center" bgcolor="ffbbbb"
| April 21 || William & Mary || Gray–Minor Stadium || 2–8 || M. Aker (1–1) || M. Eagle (0–5) ||  || 107 || 12–22 || –
|- align="center" bgcolor="bbffbb"
| April 24 || at The Citadel || Riley Park || 8–7 || J. Gomersall (2–1) || Z. Lavery (0–3) || T. Edens (10) || 447 || 13–22 || 6–7
|- align="center" bgcolor="bbffbb"
| April 26 || at The Citadel || Riley Park || 10–6 || A. Woods (5–1) || J. Sears (4–4) ||  || N/A || 14–22 || 7–7
|- align="center" bgcolor="bbffbb"
| April 26 || at The Citadel || Riley Park || 3–2 || B. Barbery (5–2) || T. Byelick (1–3) || T. Edens (11) || 475 || 15–22 || 8–7
|- align="center" bgcolor="ffbbbb"
| April 28 || at Radford || Radford Baseball Stadium || 3–6 || K. Palmer (1–0) || J. Kelley (0–2) || R. Meisinger (12) || 673 || 15–23 || –

|- align="center" bgcolor="ffbbbb"
| May 1 ||  || Gray–Minor Stadium || 2–7 || E. Nyquist (6–2) || A. Heenan (0–6) ||  || 130 || 15–24 || 8–8
|- align="center" bgcolor="ffbbbb"
| May 2 || Mercer || Gray–Minor Stadium || 6–7 || C. Varga (1–0) || J. Worthley (0–1) || M. Pittman (3) || 204 || 15–25 || 8–9
|- align="center" bgcolor="ffbbbb"
| May 3 || Mercer || Gray–Minor Stadium || 11–16 || B. Lumsden (2–1) || T. Edens (0–3) ||  || 162 || 15–26 || 8–10
|- align="center" bgcolor="bbffbb"
| May 8 ||  || Gray–Minor Stadium || 11–3 || A. Heenan (1–6) || R. Clark (6–6) ||  || 188 || 16–26 || 9–10
|- align="center" bgcolor="bbffbb"
| May 9 || UNC Greensboro || Gray–Minor Stadium || 8–2 || A. Woods (6–1) || A. Wantz (5–3) ||  || 223 || 17–26 || 10–10
|- align="center" bgcolor="ffbbbb"
| May 10 || UNC Greensboro || Gray–Minor Stadium || 11–13 || C. Woody (1–0) || B. Lafin (0–2)  ||  || 265 || 17–27 || 10–11
|- align="center" bgcolor="bbffbb"
| May 12 || James Madison || Gray–Minor Stadium || 10–6 || M. Gorman (1–1) || T. Jones (0–2) ||  || 222 || 18–27 || –
|- align="center" bgcolor="bbffbb"
| May 14 || at  || Hennon Stadium || 18–4 || A. Woods (7–1) || B. Sammons (4–5) ||  || 322 || 19–27 || 11–11
|- align="center" bgcolor="bbffbb"
| May 15 || at Western Carolina || Hennon Stadium || 11–6 || J. Worthley (1–1) || T. Powell (2–3) ||  || 449 || 20–27 || 12–11
|- align="center" bgcolor="ffbbbb"
| May 15 || at Western Carolina || Hennon Stadium || 6–11 || B. Nail (3–3) || J. Kelley (0–3) ||  || 449 || 20–28 || 12–12

|-
! style="background:#FFF;color:#000000;" | Postseason
|- 

|- bgcolor="bbffbb"
| May 21 || #5 UNC Greensboro || Riley Park • Charleston, SC || 6–5 || J. Gomersall (3–1) || T. Frazier (3–1) || T. Edens (12) || N/A || 21–28 || 1–0
|- bgcolor="ffbbbb"
| May 22 || #1 Mercer || Riley Park  • Charleston, SC || 7–19 || M. Wade (6–1) || B. Barbery (5–3) ||  || N/A || 21–29 || 1–1
|- bgcolor="ffbbbb"
| May 22 || #8 The Citadel || Riley Park  • Charleston, SC || 5–10 || Mason (3–2) || A. Heenan (1–7) || Hunter (13) || 1,066 || 21–30 || 1–2

References
Specific

General
2015 VMI Baseball schedule
2015 VMI Baseball roster

VMI
VMI Keydets baseball seasons
VMI